Gary Southwell (born 14 February 1962) is a British musician-guitarist and luthier,
 specializing in guitars of Modern Classical and Romantic eras, resident in Northumberland.

Biography
Gary Southwell studied lutherie under Herbert Schwartz at the London College of Furniture. He went on to build guitars for Julian Bream, Nigel North, Jakob Lindberg, Scott Tennant, David Starobin, David Tanenbaum, Frank Bungarten, Sting and Paul Simon.

References

External links
 

1962 births
Living people
British luthiers
English classical guitarists
English male guitarists
Musicians from Northumberland